Asaccharobacter is a bacterial genus from the family of Coriobacteriaceae. Up to now there is only one species of this genus known (Asaccharobacter celatus).

In 2018, Nouioui et al. proposed merging the genus Asaccharobacter within the genus Aldercreutzia based on observed clustering of these genera within phylogenetic trees. The correct nomenclature for the sole species of this genus is now Adlercreutzia equolifaciens subsp. celatus.

References

Further reading 
 
 

Actinomycetota
Monotypic bacteria genera
Bacteria genera